Dan Sartain vs. the Serpientes is the third album by the Birmingham, Alabama rock musician Dan Sartain, released in 2003 by Swami Records. It was Sartain's first commercially available album, his previous efforts Crimson Guard and Romance in Stereo having been self-produced and self-released. Several tracks from these albums were re-used on Vs. the Serpientes, while others were re-recorded. Several additional musicians from the Swami label recorded on the album, including members of Rocket from the Crypt, Hot Snakes, Sultans, Beehive and the Barracudas, and The Heartaches.

Track listing

Performers
Dan Sartain - vocals, guitar, bass guitar, drums, piano
John Reis - bass guitar and marracas on track 1, bass guitar and keyboards on tracks 2 and 11, guitar, bass guitar and drum machine on track 9, backing vocals on track 10, marimba on track 12
Mario Rubalcaba - drums on tracks 2, 9, and 11
Dean Reis - keyboards on track 2, bass guitar and backing vocals on track 10
Zach Evans - drums on track 3
Kylie Jackson - handclaps and backing vocals on track 3
Destin Edge - bass guitar on track 4
Jason Crane - drums on track 5, bass guitar on track 8, horns on track 13
Gar Wood - backing vocals on track 5, push button bass on track 6, lead guitar on track 8
Andy Stamets - guitar and scales on track 6
Dustin Milsap - guitar on track 6

Album information
Record label:Swami Records
Tracks 1, 2, 9, 10, and 11 recorded at Drag Racist studios in San Diego, California in February 2003 by John Reis.
Tracks 5, 6, 8, and 13 recorded at Strange Sounds in San Diego, California in February 2003 by Gar Wood.
Tracks 3, 4, 7, and 12 recorded by Dan Sartain in his garage in Birminghman, Alabama in 2001 and 2002.
Photos by Wex Frazer
Donkey photo by John Reis
Cover lettering by Courtney

References

2005 albums
Dan Sartain albums